Jarrad Weeks (born 11 July 1989) is an Australian professional basketball player for the Tasmania JackJumpers of the National Basketball League (NBL).

Early life
Born in Melbourne, Australia, Weeks graduated from Barker College in Sydney, and played one season of college basketball for Macquarie University.

Professional career
On 23 April 2018, Weeks signed with the New Zealand Breakers on a two-year deal. On 5 March 2020, Weeks signed a one-year extension with the Breakers for the 2020–21 NBL season, but he was released mid-season.

On 14 July 2021, Weeks signed with the Tasmania JackJumpers on a two-year deal.

National team career
On 17 February 2019, Weeks was called up by head coach Andrej Lemanis to be a part of the Australia national basketball team for the upcoming FIBA World Cup qualifiers against Kazakhstan and Iran. Weeks played in both games.

References

External links
Jarrad Weeks at nbl.com.au
Jarrad Weeks at archive.fiba.com

1989 births
Living people
Australian expatriate sportspeople in New Zealand
Australian men's basketball players
Cairns Taipans players
Ehingen Urspring players
Illawarra Hawks players
Junior college men's basketball players in the United States
New Zealand Breakers players
Point guards
Southland Sharks players
Sportspeople from Porirua
Sydney Kings players
Tasmania JackJumpers players